College of Our Lady Mediatrix (Colégio Medianeira) is a private Catholic pre-primary through secondary school in the Prado Velho neighborhood of Curitiba, Paraná, Brazil. It was founded by the Society of Jesus in 1957 and has grown to enroll a student population of about 3,000 students.

Founding
College of Our Lady Mediatrix was founded in 1957 by Oswaldo Gomes, on land donated by the city of Curitiba with the help of Governor Bento Munhoz da Rocha.

Medianeira participates in a distance education program, offering 15 advanced courses through the Jesuit Unisinos University.

See also
 List of Jesuit sites

References

Jesuit schools in Brazil
Catholic primary schools in Brazil
Educational institutions established in 1957
1957 establishments in Brazil
Catholic secondary schools in Brazil